is the former head coach for Toyota Alvark, Hitachi SunRockers and Earth Friends Tokyo Z in Japan.

Head coaching record

|- 
| style="text-align:left;"|Aichi Gakusen University
| style="text-align:left;"|1988-2001
| 300||258||42|||| ||||-||-||-||

|-
| style="text-align:left;"|Toyota Alvark
| style="text-align:left;"|1988-2001
| 138||82||56|||| ||||-||-||-||

|-
| style="text-align:left;"|Hitachi SunRockers
| style="text-align:left;"|2005-2013
| 190||103||87|||| ||||-||-||-||

|-
| style="text-align:left;"|Earth Friends Tokyo Z
| style="text-align:left;"|2014-2017
| 128||74||54|||| ||||-||-||-||

|-

References

External links
official website

1958 births
Living people
People from Noshiro, Akita
Alvark Tokyo coaches
Earth Friends Tokyo Z coaches
Japanese basketball coaches
Japan national basketball team coaches
Sportspeople from Akita Prefecture
Asian Games bronze medalists for Japan
Asian Games medalists in basketball
Basketball players at the 1982 Asian Games
Medalists at the 1982 Asian Games